Raphael J. Sevilla (1905–1975) was a Mexican film director, producer and screenwriter.

Selected filmography

Director
 Stronger Than Duty (1931)
 The Call of the Blood (1934) (co-director)
 Juarez and Maximillian (1934) (co-director)
 The Woman of the Port (1934)
 María Elena (1936)
 The Midnight Ghost (1940)
 La abuelita (1942)
 Porfirio Díaz (1944)
 Club verde (1946)
 Murder in the Studios (1946)
 The Lottery Ticket Seller (1953)
 La Calle de los amores (1954)

References

Bibliography
 Mora, Carl J. Mexican Cinema: Reflections of a Society. University of California Press, 1989.

External links

1905 births
1975 deaths
Mexican male screenwriters
Mexican film producers
Film directors from Mexico City
Writers from Mexico City
20th-century screenwriters